Mohammed Pasha may refer to:
 Muhammed Tewfik Pasha (1852–1892), khedive of Egypt and the Sudan and the sixth ruler from the Muhammad Ali Dynasty
 Muhammad Ali Pasha (1769–1849), Ottoman Albanian commander in the Ottoman army
 Sokollu Mehmed Pasha (1506-1579) Ottoman grand vizier of Croatian origin

See also
 Mehmed Ali Pasha (disambiguation)